Christos Christou M.D. is the international president of Médecins Sans Frontières (MSF).

Christou is from Greece where he studied medicine before working as a doctor in the UK. He joined MSF and worked as a surgeon in Cameroon, Iraq, and South Sudan before becoming elected as the Vice President, then President of MSF Greece and later succeeding Joanne Liu as the International President of MSF international.

Early life 
Christou was born in Trikala, Greece.

Education 
Christou has a degree in medicine from Aristotle University, a Ph.D in surgery from the National and Kapodistrian University, and a Master's degree in International Health and Health Crisis Management from the University of Athens.

Career 
As an emergency surgery specialist, Christou worked at North Middlesex University Hospital and King’s College Hospital in London, UK.

He joined MSF in 2002 as a volunteer surgeon, working on refugee health issues, and HIV in Cameroon, Iraq, and South Sudan.

He worked as the General Secretary, and then as the vice president before being elected as the president of MSF Greece in 2005.

Christou was elected to be the international president of MSF in June 2019. Later in 2019, he wrote an open letter to European Union leaders advocating that they cease their policy of stopping the journey of asylum seekers in the Greek islands.

In 2020, responding to an open letter from MSF staff about institutional racism, he welcomed the critique, but also questioned how widespread racism was within MSF. He also criticizes governments for failing to put in place efficient healthcare plans at the beginning of the coronavirus pandemic, especially in low income countries.

In 2021 Christou spoke about the importance of addressing climate change, criticized pharmaceutical companies for not sharing COVID-19 vaccine intellectual property, and spoke of increasing humanitarian needs in Afghanistan. 

In 2021 he was critical of Brazilian President Jair Bolsonaro's management of the COVID-19 pandemic.

References 

Médecins Sans Frontières
Living people
People from Trikala
Aristotle University of Thessaloniki alumni
National and Kapodistrian University of Athens alumni
Year of birth missing (living people)